Durek Verrett (born November 17, 1974 as Derek David Verrett) is an American businessman, alternative therapist, self-professed shaman and author. He advocates several conspiracy theories and has been characterized by Norwegian media and other critics as a conman. He is engaged to Princess Märtha Louise of Norway.

Background
Verrett grew up in the San Francisco Bay Area town of Foster City, California, and changed his name to Durek Verrett in 2014. He claims to be a 6th generation shaman. He has claimed that his mother is of Norwegian-West Indian descent and that his father is of Haitian origin. In a 2009 interview Verrett claimed to be "born into the lineages of Haitian voodoo and indigenous Norwegian medicine". 

Verrett has said that he was convicted and sentenced to five years imprisonment in the United States after he had organized a party in an abandoned house that was set on fire. He said that he served one year in prison before being released on parole.

He was formerly married to Zaneta Marzalkova, a Los Angeles resident of Czech nationality. They married in 2005 when she was 21 years old. In 2008 he reported his then-wife to the immigration authorities as an illegal resident, and as a result she was jailed and deported from the country. They divorced in 2009, and Verrett has claimed that his wife "exploited" him. From 2007 to 2015 Verrett also had a boyfriend, a masseur named Hank Greenberg, who was also his business partner. They broke off their engagement prior to their planned wedding in 2015, and Greenberg later accused Verrett of being manipulative, violent and dangerous, and said he has a "brainwashed" cult of followers where "his word is law." Verrett lived for six years with his then-manager Tiana Griego, who said that "Durek controlled my whole life. It was as if he became jealous of anything that stole his attention. I was not allowed to start a serious romantic relationship or raise my son. It was all about Durek."

Career
Verrett had a limited early career as a model and in appearances on television shows. Vanity Fair wrote about Verrett being bisexual and summed his early activities up as an eclectic early career and this helped propel his brand of new age shamanism into celebrity circles as he had grown up partly in that world.
Verrett claims to demystify spirituality by making it attainable and understandable for not only the layman, but also for the more spiritually advanced, and everyone in between. Verrett states that his "true mission is to bring the ancient practice of shamanism to the mainstream, helping people to 'get lit' by cultivating love and acceptance of themselves and others."

Verrett claims to have been initiated spiritually by one of his grandmothers (who according to fact-checking site Vantrú, died before he was born) and an American woman who calls herself "Princess Susana von Radić of Croatia" (who is described by fact-checking site Vantrú as "a fraud who claims to be a princess.") 

Verrett claims to have worked at Shamir Medical Center in Israel, where he says he treated children for cancer using shamanistic methods, but the hospital denied that he had ever worked there. Verrett also claims to be a reincarnated Pharaoh from Egypt.

In 2019 his book Spirit Hacking was set to be published in Norway, but the major publisher Cappelen Damm dropped the book a week prior to its scheduled publication over concerns over its content. It was later published by a small publisher. In the book Verrett advocates numerous "absurd medical theories." He claims children get cancer because they want it, and suggests that chemotherapy doesn't work and is only given to cancer patients because the doctors make money from it. He also writes that casual sex attracts subterranean spirits, that make an impression on the inside of women's vaginas, which he sells exercises to "clean out". Verrett also says that he can turn atoms and literally reduce age. Cancer experts called Verrett's views on cancer "dangerous." Major newspaper Dagbladet described the book as "the ravings of a lunatic." Verdens Gang called the book "nonsense, garbage and dirty talk," and said it is an unoriginal "rehash of the standard repertoire of the most cynical part of the alternative [i.e. New Age] culture."

In the book Verrett also asserts that he was resurrected as a 27-year old. He has also claimed that he foresaw the September 11 attacks two years before they happened, but said that everyone must "accept their destiny" and that it was not his role to intervene.

Verrett has stated that he considers himself to be a reptilian, and has asserted that "I'm a hybrid species of reptilian and Andromeda, and I also hold the energies of the ancient spirits from the old world. There have been lies told about our species that I want to address. We are a cluster of beings, that means that we’ve come here to create structures that help people to come into liberation. Reptilians are here to shake up the system in a big way." According to extremism researcher John Færseth, Verrett's ideas about being a reptilian are based on the Reptilian conspiracy theory advocated by David Icke. Verrett has stated that he considers the 5G technology to be a conspiracy by "those who enslave the planet."

In July 2022 Verrett was criticized in Norway for advertising a medallion he sells and that he claims cures COVID-19. The Norwegian Consumer Ombudsman said undocumented claims that products can cure diseases violate Norwegian law.

As of 2023, he sells a medallion for over 2,000 Norwegian kroner that he claims can cure dogs. It was criticized by the professional association of veterinarians as not based on science.

Relationship with Princess Märtha Louise and reception in Norway

Verrett's relationship with Princess Märtha Louise of Norway has been heavily scrutinized, with many Norwegians voicing their disapproval and calling Verrett a "charlatan". He has also been characterized by Norwegian media and other critics as a conman and a conspiracy theorist, and his statements on various topics have been widely criticized and ridiculed in Norway. The former Prime Minister of Norway Erna Solberg described Verrett's views as "very strange" and "not based on facts," and said that "the ideas that he promotes is something that we combat as conspiracy theories." Solberg further said the criticism of Verrett is reasonable. Secretary of Health Ole Henrik Krat Bjørkholt described Durek Verrett as "an unscrupulous and dangerous charlatan" who engages in fraud.

Together Märtha Louise and Verrett have organised seminars titled "The Princess and the Shaman," which also were widely criticised for the claims made by Verrett about healing cancer and for exploiting Märtha Louise's constitutional role as princess for a private business venture. For example, the newspaper iTromsø noted that Märtha Louise has faced extensive criticism for associating with a conspiracy theorist and over her "commercialization and abuse of the title 'princess'". In June 2022, Märtha Louise announced that she and Verrett were engaged. Verrett has claimed that his mother had foreseen, when he was still a child, that he would marry a Norwegian princess.

Both Verrett and Märtha Louise have complained about the negative reception of Verrett in Norway, and Verrett claimed he was criticized because "people don't want a black man in the royal family." Verrett also claimed that "I have never experienced so much racism as when I came to Norway" and said that he is misunderstood, comparing himself to "geniuses [like] Albert Einstein, Thomas Edison, the Wright brothers and Helen Keller." His claims of racism were criticized; former cabinet minister Abid Raja (of Pakistani descent) accused Verrett of "playing the race card" to distract from the criticism of his conspiracy theories and "dangerous" views, and comedian Jonna Støme, of African American descent, said that Verrett's claims undermine the real fight against racism and that people in Norway react negatively to Verrett because "he is a conman who says horrible things."

Verrett has claimed that he will become the first black person who becomes a part of a European royal family. In October 2022 Crown Prince Haakon of Norway, Märtha Louise's brother, told Norwegian broadcaster NRK that the matter of Verrett's position in their family is difficult and will take time to solve.

In November 2022, Märtha Louise relinquished her remaining royal duties to focus on her alternative medicine business with Durek Verrett.

In 2023 Verrett claimed that Märtha Louise's late husband Ari Behn, who died by suicide in 2019, has contacted him from beyond the grave.

Published work 
 Spirit Hacking: Shamanic Keys to Reclaim Your Personal Power, Transform Yourself, and Light Up the World (Ed. St. Martin's Essentials, 2019). ISBN 1250217105

References

1974 births
American criminals
American conspiracy theorists
American prisoners and detainees
LGBT people from California
Living people
New Age writers
Prisoners and detainees of the United States